The Fiji Pro 2016 was an event of the World Surf League for 2016 World Surf League.

This event was held from 07 to 19 June at Namotu, (Tavarua, Fiji) and opposed by 36 surfers.

The tournament was won by Gabriel Medina (BRA), who beat Matt Wilkinson (AUS) in final.

Round 1

Round 2

Round 3

Round 4

Round 5

Quarter finals

Semi finals

Final

References

Fiji Pro
Surfing in Fiji
2016 in Fijian sport
2016 World Surf League